Auguste Vaillant (27 December 1861 – 5 February 1894) was a French anarchist, most famous for his bomb attack on the French Chamber of Deputies on 9 December 1893. The government's reaction to this attack was the passing of the infamous repressive Lois scélérates.

Vaillant threw the home-made device from the public gallery and was immediately arrested. The weakness of the device meant that the explosion only caused slight injuries to twenty deputies. At his trial in Paris he was defended by Fernand Labori. Vaillant claimed that his aim was not to kill but to wound as many deputies as possible in revenge for the execution of Ravachol. Despite this, Vaillant was sentenced to death. He was put to death by the guillotine on 5 February 1894.

His bombing and execution in turn inspired the attacks of Émile Henry and Sante Geronimo Caserio (who stabbed to death Marie François Sadi Carnot, President of the French Third Republic) and Bhagat Singh (who threw a low-intensity bomb into the Central Legislative Assembly in British India, and was hanged later). Vaillant's last words were "Death to the Bourgeoisie!  Long live Anarchy!"

References

External links 
 Auguste Valliant Page at the Daily Bleed's Anarchist Encyclopedia

1861 births
1894 deaths
19th-century French criminals
People from Charleville-Mézières
Executed anarchists
French anarchists
French revolutionaries
Executed people from Champagne-Ardenne
People executed by the French Third Republic
19th-century executions by France
People executed by France by guillotine
Executed French people
People executed for attempted murder
Bombers (people)